Ligocki (feminine Ligocka) is a Polish surname. The "Dictionary of American Family Names" describes the origin as:

It may refer to:

 Mateusz Ligocki (born 1982), Polish snowboarder
 Michał Ligocki (born 1985), Polish snowboarder
 Paulina Ligocka (born 1984), Polish snowboarder
 Roma Ligocka (born 1938), Polish costume designer

References

Polish-language surnames